The Gulf Organization for Industrial Consulting (GOIC) is a market research organization headquartered in Doha, Qatar whose activities involve preparing economic feasibility studies, researching socio-economic statistics and promoting regional co-ordination between industrial institutions.

Founding
The GOIC was founded in 1976 by the Gulf Cooperation Council (GCC) member states: The United Arab Emirates, Bahrain, Saudi Arabia, Oman, Qatar and Kuwait, and in 2009, Yemen joined the Organization. The Organization is headquartered at Doha, Qatar. The organization chart of GOIC includes the Board members and the General Secretariat. The Board is formed by member state representatives appointed by their governments.

List of member states

Abdullah bin Juma Al – Shibli from the Kingdom of Saudi Arabia is the current observer from Gulf Cooperation Council (GCC).

Objectives
GOIC’s main mission is the identification, evaluation and promotion of joint industrial projects in member states. In addition, the GOIC publishes studies of the state of industries within the GCC, periodicals and maintains a number of useful databases. It also runs a number of training programs and conferences in various industrial subjects. Gulf Industrial Knowledge Centre (GIKC) will provide a unique set of GOIC’s outputs from various industrial studies and industrial investment opportunities, new reports about several industrial sectors. The Sultanate of Oman hosted the 14th GCC Industrialists' Conference under the theme of "Industrial Exports: Opportunities & Challenges" on 2014 March 30 and 31.
The 15th Industrialists’ Conference on "FDI in GCC and its impact on industry" will be held in Kuwait for two days from Nov. 25, with the support of Sheikh Sabah Al-Ahmad Al-Jaber Al-Sabah, emir of Kuwait, and the participation of GCC ministers of industry

Trust fund agreement between the United Nations Industrial Development Organization and the Gulf Organization for industrial consulting regarding the implementation of a project entitled "Assistance in strengthening the Gulf Organization for Industrial Consulting, Phase 2:Industrial subcontracting and partnership exchange" signed on 17 February 2006.

Based on the above agreement between United Nations Industrial Development Organization(UNIDO), The Gulf Organization for Industrial Consulting (GOIC) is responsible for executing the subcontracting and partnership exchange program within GCC countries.

References

External links
 www.goic.org
 www.imiplus.goic.org.qa
 www.gspx.info
 www.knowledge.goic.org.qa/
 www.incge.com/

1976 establishments in Qatar
Research institutes in Qatar
Market research organizations
Gulf Cooperation Council